Lee Jong-sup (20 August 1960) is a retired South Korean army lieutenant general and former Vice Chairman of the Joint Chiefs of Staff who currently serves as Minister of National Defense. He has held that office since May 2022.

References 

|-

1960 births
Living people
People from Yeongcheon
Korea Military Academy alumni
Tennessee State University alumni
Republic of Korea Army personnel
National Defense ministers of South Korea
Foreign recipients of the Legion of Merit